(Parliamentary) Committee on Civil Affairs (CU) is a parliamentary committee in the Swedish Riksdag that was founded on October 1, 2006, with the merger of the Law Committee and the Housing Committee. The committee's areas of responsibility concern housing policy, consumer policy, community planning, and civil law.

When the committee was founded it was the largest reorganization of the Swedish Parliament since the abolishment of the bicameral Riksdag in 1971.

List of speakers for the committee

List of vice-speakers for the committee

References

External links
Riksdag – Civil Affairs Committee

Committees of the Riksdag